Valkenswaard is a municipality and a town in the southern Netherlands, in the Metropoolregio Eindhoven of the province of North Brabant.

The name Valkenswaard stems from its history of falconers, who caught wild falcons there; valk is Dutch for "falcon". It lay on a route where falcons migrated south each year. In the 17th, 18th, and 19th centuries, Valkenswaardian falconers were active at many European courts, in which falconing was a beloved pastime. Valkenswaard's falcon-catching area has now been built over and falcons are no longer caught there.

In the 19th and 20th century, a number of large cigar factories were founded in Valkenswaard, the two most renowned of which being Willem II and Hofnar.

A Second World War cemetery containing 220 British soldiers was created near Valkenswaard in October 1944. It is now maintained by the Commonwealth War Graves Commission.

The spoken language is Kempenlands (an East Brabantian dialect, which is very similar to colloquial Dutch).

The Eurocircuit Valkenswaard is a motorsport racetrack that has hosted the European Rallycross Championship and the FIM Motocross World Championship.

Population centres
Borkel en Schaft
Dommelen
Valkenswaard

Topography

Dutch topographic map of the municipality of Valkenswaard, June 2015

Partner municipalities

Notable people born in Valkenswaard

 Henk van den Breemen (born 1941) a retired Dutch military officer
 Pieter van Geel (born 1951) a retired Dutch politician
 Linda Williams (born 1955) a Dutch singer, participated in the 1981 Eurovision Song Contest
 Ine Gevers (born 1960) a Dutch curator of contemporary art, writer and activist
 Jeroen Mettes (1978-2006) a Dutch poet, essayist and blogger
 Dominique van Hulst (born 1981), singer, known by her stage name Do

Sport 
 Jan Tops (born 1961) an equestrian, gold medallist at the 1992 Summer Olympics
 Jens van Son (born 1987) a Dutch professional footballer with over 250 club caps
 Lidewij Welten (born 1990) a Dutch field hockey player
 Daniëlle van de Donk (born 1991) a Dutch professional footballer

Gallery

References

External links

Official website

 
Municipalities of North Brabant
Populated places in North Brabant